The Hunter Railcars are a class of diesel multiple unit operated by NSW TrainLink on the Hunter Line in New South Wales, Australia. Built by UGL Rail between November 2006 and September 2007, they initially operated for CityRail.

History 

In 2001, the Government of New South Wales called for tenders for seven two-carriage railcar sets to replace the remaining 620/720 railcars on Hunter Line services, with a contract awarded to Goninan in 2002.

Each set comprises two powered cars with one having a toilet. The first set entered service on 23 November 2006, operating a small number of Newcastle to Telarah services on Thursday and Fridays only. The second set entered service on 8 January 2007 also operating a limited number of services. By September 2007, all seven had entered service. They operate services from Newcastle to Dungog and Scone alongside the Endeavours.

All sets passed from CityRail to NSW TrainLink with the Hunter line services in July 2013. In 2014/15, they received refurbished seats, improved toilet facilities, anti-graffiti interior paint and NSW TrainLink vinyls.

Design 

The design of the Hunter Railcars is derived from the Transwa Prospector and AvonLink - the major difference being the driving cars are each single-engined instead of dual-engined, due to the lower top speed requirement for the Hunter line. Reversible seating is covered with durable, vandal proof woollen moquette fabric in 3x2 formation, and have retractable footrests. CCTV is installed. The cars have been fitted with Dellner SP couplers. They are able to absorb the impact of a collision, and the anti-climbers will also reduce the force of impact. They also have a different body design. Instead of the entire body being of the same design, such as the Tangara, the driver's cab is built as a protective cage, made of fibreglass, which stretches to the end of the guard's door. The stainless steel paneling starts at the guard's door. The guard's door is designed to operate separately from the passenger doors.

The Hunter Railcar has multiple-unit capability with the earlier Endeavour and Xplorers, but only in the event of failure or for empty coaching stock movements. These cars normally operate as two-car sets, however during peak periods they can operate as four-car sets.

An auxiliary  Cummins 6ISBe-G1 diesel engine drives a Newage Stamford UCI274H alternator to supply power for the air conditioning and lighting.

References

External links 

Diesel multiple units of New South Wales
NSW TrainLink
Train-related introductions in 2006